Tricks is a 1925 American silent comedy Western film directed by Bruce Mitchell and starring Marilyn Mills, J. Frank Glendon, and Dorothy Vernon. Future star Gary Cooper appeared as an extra in one of his earliest film roles.

Synopsis
College girl Angelica dreams of an adventure on her father's ranch. After being expelled she returns home and finds her dream about a gang of rustlers appears to be real.

Cast

References

Bibliography
 Connelly, Robert B. The Silents: Silent Feature Films, 1910-36, Volume 40, Issue 2. December Press, 1998.
 Munden, Kenneth White. The American Film Institute Catalog of Motion Pictures Produced in the United States, Part 1. University of California Press, 1997.

External links
 

1925 films
1925 Western (genre) films
1920s English-language films
American silent feature films
Silent American Western (genre) films
American black-and-white films
Films directed by Bruce M. Mitchell
1920s American films